is a Japanese professional footballer who plays as a midfielder.

Career
During 2010, he played in Japan in J2 League with Oita Trinita. In summer 2012, he moved to Montenegro and joined top-league side OFK Grbalj. After a short spell there where he failed to make any league appearance, he moved to FK Bokelj and won with them the 2013–14 Montenegrin Second League and earned a promotion to the First League in next season. 

He scored his first goal for Yangon United FC against Hanthawaddy United F.C. in the beginning of the 2018 Myanmar National league.

In 2022, Uchida signed with I-League 2nd Division side Delhi FC, before moving to I-League club Sudeva Delhi.

Honours
Bokelj
Montenegrin Second League: 2013–14

References

External links

1987 births
Living people
Ritsumeikan University alumni
Association football people from Kyoto Prefecture
Japanese footballers
J2 League players
Japan Football League players
Oita Trinita players
FC Ryukyu players
OFK Grbalj players
FK Bokelj players
Lanexang United F.C. players
Persela Lamongan players
Yangon United F.C. players
PS Barito Putera players
Angkor Tiger FC players
Japanese expatriate sportspeople in Montenegro
Expatriate footballers in Montenegro
Japanese expatriate sportspeople in Laos
Expatriate footballers in Laos
Japanese expatriate sportspeople in Indonesia
Expatriate footballers in Indonesia
Japanese expatriate sportspeople in Myanmar
Expatriate footballers in Myanmar
Japanese expatriate sportspeople in Cambodia
Expatriate footballers in Cambodia
Association football midfielders